The Knife Thrower and Other Stories by Steven Millhauser, first published in 1998 by Crown Publishers, Inc., New York City.  It is a collection of short stories, some of which were published by various journals, such as The Paris Review, Harper's Magazine, and The New Yorker. It continues in a similar vein to Millhauser's previous efforts that mix the extraordinary into everyday life.

Stories, with previous publishers, if available.

"The Knife Thrower" (Harper's Magazine)
"A Visit" (The New Yorker)
"The Sisterhood of Night" (Harper's Magazine)
"The Way Out" (Story)
"Flying Carpets" (The Paris Review)
"The New Automaton Theater" (Canto)
"Clair de Lune"
"The Dream of the Consortium" (Harper's Magazine)
"Balloon Flight, 1870" (The Yale Review)
"Paradise Park" (Grand Street)
"Kaspar Hauser Speaks" (The Kenyon Review)
"Beneath the Cellars of Our Town"

References 

The Knife Thrower and Other Stories by Steven Milhauser, published by Vintage Press, First Vintage Contemporaries Edition, March 1999.

1998 short story collections
Crown Publishing Group books
American short story collections